Lewis Campbell (April 1864 – 1938) was a Scottish footballer. He was pacey and difficult to defend against.

Career
Campbell played for Dumbarton, Helensburgh, Glasgow United, and Hibernian, before moving to England to play for Aston Villa in January 1890. At Villa he earned an FA Cup runner-up medal in 1892 as he was unable to prevent West Bromwich Albion romping to victory 3–0 at The Oval. In August 1893, he joined Port Vale. He claimed 13 goals in 27 Second Division in the 1893–94 season, and became the first "Valiant" to score a hat-trick (he actually scored four goals) in the Football League in a 5–0 win over Walsall Town Swifts on 9 September. However, he left the Athletic Ground in 1894 because his wife did not like the Potteries area. He moved on to Walsall Town Swifts and then Burton Swifts.

Career statistics
Source:

Honours
Aston Villa
FA Cup runner-up: 1892

References

Footballers from Edinburgh
Scottish footballers
Association football wingers
Dumbarton F.C. players
Helensburgh F.C. players
Hibernian F.C. players
Aston Villa F.C. players
Port Vale F.C. players
Walsall F.C. players
Burton Swifts F.C. players
English Football League players
FA Cup Final players
1864 births
1938 deaths